Phelps County Courthouse is a historic courthouse located in Rolla, Phelps County, Missouri.  The original section was built between 1860 and 1868 and is a two-story, Greek Revival style brick building.  The original building measures approximately 45 feet by 65 feet. It sits on a stone foundation and has a low-pitched gable roof. A series of additions were made in 1881, 1912, c. 1950, and 1979.

It was listed on the National Register of Historic Places in 1993.

References

County courthouses in Missouri
Courthouses on the National Register of Historic Places in Missouri
Government buildings completed in 1868
Rolla, Missouri
Buildings and structures in Phelps County, Missouri
Tourist attractions in Phelps County, Missouri
National Register of Historic Places in Phelps County, Missouri